Phormingochilus is a genus of Indonesian tarantulas that was first described by Reginald Innes Pocock in 1895. They are occasionally kept as exotic pets, and are known for moving in bursts of speed and being defensive when cornered.

Diagnosis 
They can be distinguished by the round apex of the male palpal bulb, they can also be distinguished by the size of leg 1 and 4 in females. Further more, they can only be found in Borneo.

Species
 it contains four species, found on Borneo:
Phormingochilus arboricola (Schmidt & Barensteiner, 2015) – Borneo
Phormingochilus everetti Pocock, 1895 (type) – Borneo
Phormingochilus pennellhewlettorum Smith & Jacobi, 2015 – Malaysia (Borneo)
Phormingochilus tigrinus Pocock, 1895 – Borneo

Formerly included:
P. carpenteri Smith & Jacobi, 2015 → Lampropelma carpenteri 
P. fuchsi Strand, 1906 → Omothymus fuchsi 
P. kirki Smith & Jacobi, 2015 → Lampropelma carpenteri

See also
 List of Theraphosidae species

References

Theraphosidae genera
Spiders of Asia
Taxa named by R. I. Pocock
Theraphosidae